Carrie Dimoff (born May 31, 1983) is an American athlete. She competed in the women's marathon event at the 2019 World Athletics Championships.

References

External links
 

1983 births
Living people
American female long-distance runners
American female marathon runners
Place of birth missing (living people)
World Athletics Championships athletes for the United States
21st-century American women